Xie Weijun (born 14 November 1997) is a Chinese footballer who currently plays for Tianjin TEDA in the Chinese Super League. He is the son of Chinese former international Xie Yuxin.

Club career
Xie Weijun joined Chinese Super League side Tianjin TEDA from Guangzhou Evergrande Taobao on 28 February 2018. However, he failed to register for the senior league match due to the contract dispute between Guangzhou Evergrande Taobao and Zhuhai Suoka. He was promoted to Tianjin TEDA's first team squad in June 2018 after the settlement of dispute. On 18 July 2018, he made his senior debut in a 1–0 away defeat to Shanghai Greenland Shenhua, coming on as a substitute for Cao Yang in the 84th minute. He scored his first senior goal on 5 August 2018, the winner in a 2–1 away win over Hebei China Fortune, one minute after coming on as a substitute.

Career statistics
.

References

External links
 

1997 births
Living people
Chinese footballers
People from Xingning
Footballers from Guangzhou
Footballers from Meizhou
Hakka sportspeople
Tianjin Jinmen Tiger F.C. players
Chinese Super League players
Association football forwards